Loxophlebia pyrgion is a moth of the subfamily Arctiinae. It was described by Herbert Druce in 1884. It is found in Panama and French Guiana.

References

 

Loxophlebia
Moths described in 1884